Fábio Gonçalves Silva (born March 27, 1977) is a bobsledder from Brazil. He competed for Brazil at the 2014 Winter Olympics in the four-man competition where he placed in 29th position out of 30 teams along with (Edson Bindilatti, Edson Martins and Odirlei Pessoni).

References 

1977 births
Living people
Brazilian male bobsledders
Olympic bobsledders of Brazil
Bobsledders at the 2014 Winter Olympics